Lesley Nneka Arimah (born 13 October 1983 in London, United Kingdom) is a Nigerian writer. She has been described as "a skillful storyteller who can render entire relationships with just a few lines of dialogue" and "a new voice with certain staying power." She is the winner of the 2015 Commonwealth Short Story Prize for Africa, the 2017 O. Henry Prize, the 2017 Kirkus Prize, and the 2019 Caine Prize for African Writing.

Biography 
Arimah was born on 13 October 1983 in London. She grew up in both Nigeria and the U.K., but frequently moved around due to her father being in the military. In her early teens, she moved to the U.S., where she received her Master of Fine Arts in creative writing from Minnesota State University Mankato in 2010.

In September 2017, the National Book Foundation honored Arimah as one of their  "Five Under 35" writers to watch, and in 2019, she was a United States Artists Fellow in Writing.

Arimah currently lives in Las Vegas, Nevada, United States.

Writing

Short stories 
Arimah's work has appeared in The New Yorker, Granta, Harper's, Per Contra, and several other publications.

What It Means When a Man Falls from the Sky (2017) 

Arimah's debut collection of short stories, What It Means When a Man Falls from the Sky, was published by Riverhead Books and Tinder Press (UK) in April 2017, then republished in Nigeria by Farafina Books in November 2017. 

The book centres on women protagonists exposed to a harsh environment that pushes them "to take certain steps to fit in, or make them realize, they just might not fit in," offering "a humanizing portrait of both the Nigerian citizen and first generation young female immigrant", showcasing "their flaws, their desires, their victories, and their attempts at carving out a place in a country whose customs and values diverge from that of their heritage.

The collection explores women's alienation from a number of angles, "including the fraught relationships between mothers and daughters and the complicated dynamics of female friendship." Her writing, The Atlantic wrote, "conveys respect for the people who claw their way through relentlessly difficult lives." NPR calls it "It's a truly wonderful debut by a young author who seems certain to have a very bright literary future ahead of her."

The short stories also each work in harmoniously to tell the stories of Nigerian women, life, and their upbringing. The short story in particular that incorporated gender norms of girls compared to what they choose to be are specifically explored in the story "Light" in which the father and mother cannot agree on what beautiful looks like for their daughter can connect to what society views as the beauty standard for today is and how it is evolving. While the mother in this story wants her daughter to appeal to more European standards of beauty by perming her hair, her father sees that this will in fact dim her light so ultimately wants her to be herself and through this, she shines on her own by not living up to the normal expectations put on her as a person from her mother and the society's at large standard of beauty. Relating to these themes, the story "Who Will Greet You At Home" explores the struggles of motherhood, class, expectation, and empathy. The protagonist, Ogechi, tries to fabricate a child out of the materials around her. The short story and title of the book "When a Man Falls from the Sky" explores the idea of pain and grief and how heavy a burden they can feel like with an added focus on class and imperialism. It, breaking from the rest of the stories, fits into the science fiction genre. In this story, Nneoma can remove grief through mathematics, in a Bi-African state controlled by Britain, with implications of brutal French rule of her former colonies.

This theme of dealing with grief occurs frequently in the collection, and appears in the penultimate story of the collection, entitled: "What is a Volcano". This story takes a folkloric twist, following gods and goddesses dealing with the grief that comes with losing a child. This beautiful story explores the fact that immortal beings can feel very human emotions, noting that grief is a powerful force that can overwhelm anyone, even goddesses.

These short stories explore the genre of magical realism, where a fantastical element is added to realistic fiction. In many of her stories, Arimah takes a plot that could very well just be realism and adds a magical twist. By doing this, she is able to put a new lens on important themes throughout the collection, and allow her readers to understand difficult subjects, such as grief and poverty through magical elements.

Publications 
 What It Means When A Man Falls From The Sky, New York: Riverhead, 2017. ,

References

External links
 Lesley Nneka Arimah's website
 Chukwuebuka Ibeh, "The Brittle Paper Interview with the Caine Prize 2019 Winner: Lesley Nneka Arimah", Brittle Paper, 20 September 2019.
 Lesley Nneka Arimah Wins 2019 Caine Prize For African Writing, NPR, 14 July 2019
 Caine Prize Winner - Lesley Nneka Arimah, BBC, 23 July 2019

Living people
Igbo women writers
21st-century Nigerian writers
21st-century Nigerian women writers
1983 births
Kirkus Prize winners
Nommo Award winners
Caine Prize winners